The Lockheed Model 8 Sirius was a single-engined, propeller-driven monoplane designed and built by Jack Northrop and Gerard Vultee while they were engineers at Lockheed in 1929, at the request of Charles Lindbergh. Two versions of the same basic design were built for the United States Air Force, one made largely of wood with a fixed landing gear, and one with a metal skin and retractable landing gear, designated Y1C-25 and Y1C-23, respectively. Its basic role was intended to be as a utility transport.

History
A total of 15 Sirius aircraft were constructed in 1929 and 1930.

The first and best known Sirius was bought by Lindbergh, and in 1931, as NR-211, it was retrofitted to be a float plane. Lindbergh and his wife Anne Morrow Lindbergh flew it to the Far East, where she wrote a book about their experiences there entitled North to the Orient. The aircraft was damaged in Hankou, China, when it accidentally capsized while being lowered off the aircraft carrier HMS Hermes, and had to be sent back to Lockheed to be repaired.

In 1931, György Endresz and Sándor Magyar made a successful US–Hungary transatlantic flight with a Lockheed Sirius 8A aircraft named "Justice for Hungary".

In 1933, the Lindberghs set out again with their Sirius, now upgraded with a more powerful engine, a new directional gyro, and an artificial horizon. This time, their route would take them across the northern Atlantic, with no particular destination, but primarily to scout for potential new airline routes for Pan Am.
While at a refueling stop in Angmagssalik, Greenland, the Inuit of the area gave the Sirius a nickname, "Tingmissartoq" or "one who flies like a bird". They continued on their flight and made many stops in Europe, Russia, then south to Africa, back across the southern Atlantic to Brazil and back over the skies of New York City at the end of 1933, after 30,000 miles and 21 countries; droves of people turned out to greet them as they landed.

The aircraft was in the American Museum of Natural History in New York City until 1955, when ownership was transferred to the National Museum of the United States Air Force in Dayton, Ohio. It was given to the Smithsonian Institution in 1959, and it went on display at the National Air and Space Museum when the original facility opened on the National Mall in 1976.

Variants

Lockheed 8 Sirius Single-engine, two-seat, long-range, high-performance aircraft; one built for Charles Lindbergh.
Sirius 8 First production version, similar to the Lockheed 8 Sirius; one built.
Sirius 8A Equipped with an enlarged tail surface; eight built.
Sirius 8C Four-seat version fitted with an enclosed cabin seating two passengers, located between the engine and the pilot's cockpit; one built.
DL-2 Metal fuselage and wooden wings. One built by the Detroit Aircraft Corporation.

Operators

 Spanish Republican Air Force

Specifications (Lindbergh's Sirius 8)

See also
 List of Lockheed aircraft

References

Notes

Bibliography

 Francillon, René J. Lockheed Aircraft since 1913. London: Putnam, 1982. ;

External links

 Aircraft of the Smithsonian: Lockheed 8 Sirius 
 Lockheed Sirius in Geneva (1933)

Sirius
1920s United States civil utility aircraft
Single-engined tractor aircraft
Low-wing aircraft
Aircraft first flown in 1929